Daniela Vlaeva (born 7 March 1976) is a Bulgarian short track speed skater. She competed at the 1998 Winter Olympics and the 2002 Winter Olympics. Vlaeva has won three bronze medals in 3000 metre relay at the 1999, 2001, and 2003 World Championships, respectively.

References

1976 births
Living people
Bulgarian female short track speed skaters
Olympic short track speed skaters of Bulgaria
Short track speed skaters at the 1998 Winter Olympics
Short track speed skaters at the 2002 Winter Olympics
Sportspeople from Sofia